Number One Shakib Khan (also known as No1SK) is a Bangladeshi Bengali action comedy film directed by Badiul Alam Khokon and it was released in Eid al-Fitr 2010 and became one of the highest grossing Bangladeshi film of all time. The film stars Shakib Khan play the title role and 60% of this film was shot in Bangkok. The film is remake of 2002, Telugu film Allari Ramudu, starring Jr NTR, Nagma, Gajala and Aarti Agarwal.

Plot
The film focuses on a young man who struggles to stand on his own feet. Thrilled by his ideology and honesty, the heroine Apu Biswas makes up her mind to stand beside him with her love (Shakib Khan) to make his dream come true.

Cast
 Shakib Khan
 Apu Biswas
 Misha Sawdagar
 Nuton
 Ali Raj
 Sadek Bachhu
 Prabir Mitra
 Annan
 Afzal Sharif 
 Ratan khan
 Shiba Shanu

Production
Popular film actor Shakib Khan is playing in the name role. The cast also includes Nuton, Ali Raj and Sadek Bachchu, among others.

Soundtrack 

The soundtrack of Number One Shakib Khan was composed by Ali Akram Shuvo. and "Number one shakib khan"  is one of the popular film song of 2010.

Track listing

Box office
 The film first released to 75 cinema hall which was the widest release of any Bangladeshi film till 2014. Few weeks later it released to 300 cinema hall gradually.

Awards and nominations
 Binodon Bichitra Award 2010
 won. Best actor: Shakib Khan

 Uro-CJFB Performance Award 2010
 won. Best actor: Shakib Khan
 Won. for Best Story
 Walton Boishakhi Star Award 2011
 won. Best actor: Shakib Khan
Babisas Award 2010
 won. Best actor: Shakib Khan

References

External links
 

2010 films
2010s action comedy-drama films
2010 romantic comedy-drama films
Bengali-language Bangladeshi films
Bangladeshi action comedy-drama films
Bangladeshi romantic comedy-drama films
Films scored by Ali Akram Shuvo
2010s Bengali-language films
Bangladeshi remakes of Indian films
Bangladeshi remakes of Telugu films